Otto Sonnleitner (7 June 1936 – 18 February 2022) was an Australian rules footballer who played with South Melbourne in the Victorian Football League (VFL).

After football, he became a swimming coach, and was a life member of the Australian Swim Coach and Teachers Association.

Notes

External links 

1936 births
2022 deaths
Australian rules footballers from Victoria (Australia)
Sydney Swans players
Ballarat Football Club players
Australian swimming coaches